Michael Schmidt Jr. (born April 15, 1958, in Decatur, Illinois) is an American sport shooter. He competed at the 2000 Summer Olympics in the men's skeet event, in which he tied for 35th place.

References

1958 births
Living people
People from Decatur, Illinois
Skeet shooters
American male sport shooters
Shooters at the 2000 Summer Olympics
Olympic shooters of the United States
Pan American Games medalists in shooting
Pan American Games gold medalists for the United States
Shooters at the 1991 Pan American Games